The Damage Done may refer to:

 The Damage Done (book), by Warren Fellows, 1997
 The Damage Done (EP), by Gumball, 1993

See also
 Damage Done (disambiguation)